See also USS Young for similarly named ships.

The ship was built by the Ingalls Shipbuilding Division of Litton Industries at Pascagoula, Mississippi.

In 1987, John Young deployed off the coast of Iran in support of Operation Earnest Will and participated in Operation Nimble Archer.

John Young, following appropriate Congressional notification, became one of eight combat ships that began receiving women as crewmembers in 1994.

As part of a reorganization by the Pacific Fleet's surface ships into six core battle groups and eight destroyer squadrons, with the reorganization scheduled to be completed by 1 October 1995, and homeport changes to be completed within the following, year, John Young was reassigned to Destroyer Squadron 23.

John Young departed San Diego on 9 February 1996 enroute to the Persian Gulf for a six-month deployment as part of the Middle East Force (MEF).  This deployment was remarkable because a main engineering space was completely gutted and refitted following a major fuel oil leak just days before that trapped several crew members in thirty thousand gallons of fuel.  The ship was having extensive last-minute pre-deployment repairs, requiring most of the installed firefighting systems to be disabled.  Also, the fire-proof escape doors in all the engineering spaces were temporarily removed for repairs.  Had the fuel ignited, it would have been catastrophic to not only John Young, but the many ships nearby in port.

On 28 April 1998, Navy and Coast Guard inspectors aboard John Young boarded a merchant ship thus marking the 10,000th such boarding in support of United Nations sanctions against Iraq. As part of a multinational maritime interception force, operating in the Persian Gulf, the team boarded an Indian flagged dhow in the Persian Gulf to make the milestone boarding. The vessel was empty and permitted to proceed.

John Young departed San Diego on 18 November 1997 en route to the Persian Gulf for a six-month deployment as part of the Middle East Force (MEF).

John Young teamed up with a Coast Guard Law Enforcement Detachment (LEDET) in late March 2001 for a major drug bust at sea. She was last stationed at San Diego, California.

Fate 
John Young was decommissioned on 30 September 2002, and stricken 6 November 2002, laid up at Bremerton, Washington NISMF. On 13 April 2004, John Young was sunk during exercise RIMPAC 04 by a Mark 48 torpedo fired by the submarine , which broke her in half.

Gallery

References

External links

 
 navsource.org: USS John Young
 combatindex.com: USS John Young
 united-states-navy.com: USS John Young
 Yahoo! Newsgroup for former John Young Crewmembers
 Reunion website and info for former John Young Crewmembers

 

Spruance-class destroyers
Cold War destroyers of the United States
1976 ships
Ships sunk as targets